Arthur Rinderknech was the defending champion but chose not to defend his title.

James Duckworth won the title after defeating Wu Tung-lin 6–4, 6–2 in the final.

Seeds

Draw

Finals

Top half

Bottom half

References

External links
Main draw
Qualifying draw

Amex-Istanbul Challenger II - 1
2021 Singles 2